The Philosophy of Andy Warhol (From A to B & Back Again) is a 1975 book by the American artist Andy Warhol. It was first published by Harcourt Brace Jovanovich.

The book is an assemblage of vignettes about love, beauty, fame, work, sex, time, death, economics, success, and art, among other topics, by the "Prince of Pop".

History
Warhol signed two book contracts in 1974 with Harcourt, one for The Philosophy and the second for a biography of Paulette Goddard, which was never completed.

The Philosophy was ghostwritten by Warhol's frequent collaborator, Pat Hackett, and Interview magazine editor Bob Colacello. Much of the material is drawn from taped interviews Hackett did with Warhol specifically for the book, and also from conversations Warhol had taped between himself and Colacello and Brigid Berlin.

Warhol promoted the book in September 1975 on a nine-city U.S. book tour, followed by stops in Italy, France, and England.

In October 2019, an audio tape of publicly unknown music by Lou Reed, based on the book, was reported to have been discovered in an archive at the Andy Warhol Museum in Pittsburgh.

References

1975 non-fiction books
Books by Andy Warhol
English-language books